Are You Gonna Eat That? is the debut full-length album by the American hip hop group Hail Mary Mallon, consisting of rapper/producers Aesop Rock and Rob Sonic, and disc jockey DJ Big Wiz.

Release 
It was released digitally on May 3, 2011, and was subsequently released on CD and double vinyl on June 7, 2011, by Rhymesayers. The album's first single was the song "Smock". It has sold over 1,197 copies in its first week and 3,648 digitally according to SoundScan through independent hip hop label Rhymesayers Entertainment.

Track listing

Charts

Personnel 
Credits adapted from the album's liner notes.

 Aesop Rock – production 
 Rob Sonic – production 
 DJ Big Wiz – scratching
 Allyson Baker – guitar
 Bruce Templeton – mastering
 Joey Raia – mixing

References

External links
 

2011 albums
Hail Mary Mallon albums
Rhymesayers Entertainment albums